4-Octyne, also known as dipropylethyne, is a type of alkyne with a triple bond at its fourth carbon (the '4-' indicates the location of the triple bond in the chain). Its formula is C8H14. 

4-Octyne forms with 5-decyne, 3-hexyne, and 2-butyne a group of symmetric alkynes.

Preparation 
One method for synthesizing 4-octyne is the reaction between acetylene and two equivalents of 1-bromopropane. Acetylene is first deprotonated by a base to give an anion, which then undergoes nucleophilic substitution with the bromopropane. The resulting alkyne is again deprotonated and reacts similarly with a second molecule of bromopropane. This reaction can be carried out in liquid ammonia at −70 °C with sodium amide as the base.

Another synthetic route is the elimination reaction of 4,5-dibromooctane, which can be done in similar conditions.

Properties 
4-octyne is a colorless liquid at room temperature. Its density at 25 °C and otherwise stable conditions is 0.751 g/mL. The boiling point is 131–132 °C. The average molar mass is 110.20 g/mol.

References

External links 
 

Alkynes